Assisi railway station serves the town and comune of Assisi, in the Umbria region, central Italy.  Opened in 1866, it forms part of the Foligno–Terontola railway, which also links Florence with Rome.

The station is currently managed by Rete Ferroviaria Italiana (RFI).  However, the commercial area of the passenger building is managed by Centostazioni.  Train services are operated by or on behalf of Trenitalia.  Each of these companies is a subsidiary of Ferrovie dello Stato (FS), Italy's state-owned rail company.

Regional train services calling at the station are operated by Ferrovia Centrale Umbra, which sub-contracts on behalf of Trenitalia.

Location

History
The station was opened on 21 July 1866, upon the inauguration of the Foligno–Collestrada section of the Foligno–Terontola railway.

Features
The passenger building is on two levels, but only the ground floor is accessible to the traveller.  The first floor houses some Trenitalia offices. Next to the passenger building is another building, single storey but lengthy.  It, too, houses Trenitalia offices. On the other side of the passenger building (originally occupied by a goods yard) there are other small single storey buildings, which house the RFI technical departments.

The station yard consists of three tracks: track 1 is just a single track through line, and the other two tracks are used for overtaking. All tracks are served by platforms connected by an underpass.

Previously, there was a goods yard that has now been dismantled.  As at 2010, the yard area was vacant.

Passenger and train movements
The station has about 800,000 passenger movements each year.

Trains are mainly regional rail services, with occasional InterCity trains to Milan, and Eurostar trains to Perugia and Rome.   Regional services are operated by Ferrovia Centrale Umbra, which sub-contracts on behalf of Trenitalia.  InterCity and long-distance services are operated by Trenitalia itself.

About 54 trains call at the station each day.  The main destinations of the regional trains are Rome, Florence, Foligno, Terontola-Cortona, Terni and Perugia.

Interchange
Local bus services link the station with the city centre.

See also

History of rail transport in Italy
List of railway stations in Umbria
Rail transport in Italy
Railway stations in Italy

References

External links

Description and pictures of Assisi railway station 

This article is based upon a translation of the Italian language version as at December 2010.

Railway Station
Railway stations in Umbria
Railway stations opened in 1866
1866 establishments in Italy
Railway stations in Italy opened in the 19th century